Bactrocythara candeana is a species of sea snail, a marine gastropod mollusk in the family Mangeliidae.

Description
The length of the shell attains 4 mm.

The spire of the whitish shell is longitudinally plicate. The body whorl lacks sculpture except a few revolving lines at the base.

Distribution
This marine species occurs off Guadeloupe; Martinique; on the Mid-Atlantic Ridge.

References

External links
  Tucker, J.K. 2004 Catalog of recent and fossil turrids (Mollusca: Gastropoda). Zootaxa 682:1-1295.
 Image of a shell of Bactrocythara candeana
  Bouchet P., Kantor Yu.I., Sysoev A. & Puillandre N. (2011) A new operational classification of the Conoidea. Journal of Molluscan Studies 77: 273-308.

candeana
Gastropods described in 1847